Government College Kottayam is an arts and science college run by the state government of Kerala, India. It is affiliated to the Mahatma Gandhi University and is located in Nattakom, close to Kottayam in central Kerala.

It was established in 1972 and situated in the outskirts of Kottayam.

The institute has three research centres, six postgraduate programmes and ten undergraduate programmes. The college functions under the Department of Collegiate Education, Government of Kerala. It is the only government-owned Arts and Science College in Kottayam district. The college is affiliated to Mahatma Gandhi University, Kottayam and is included under sections 2(f) and 12B of the University Grants Commission (UGC). The college was graded A by the National Assessment and Accreditation Council (NAAC) after the second cycle of the reaccreditation of the college in 2016.

History 
Government College, Kottayam was established by the Government of Kerala in 1972. The college was inaugurated by the then Chief Minister of Kerala, Hon. Shri. C. Achutha Menon. Foundations for the new building were laid in 1976 and it was inaugurated in 1980. New blocks were constructed in 1987 and 2007 and a women's hostel in 2012.

The college has smart classrooms, EDUSAT, computerized library, INFLIBNET, and laboratories. Three new courses, M.A. Politics, M.Com. and B.A. English, were started in 2012. Undergraduate and postgraduate programmes are offered under the Choice Based Credit and Semester System of Mahatma Gandhi University. Along with the regular degree programmes, students can obtain a second degree qualification in a vocational subject under the Additional Skill Acquisition Programme of the Government of Kerala.

Organisation and administration

Governance 
Government College, Kottayam functions under the Department of Collegiate Education, Government of Kerala. The College Council headed by the Principal and consisting of all Heads of Departments, two elected members from among the teaching staff and the Librarian and the Junior Superintendent as permanent invitees helps the principal in academic and administrative matters.

Departments 
 Botany
 Chemistry 
 Commerce 
 Economics 
 English 
 Geology 
 Mathematics
 Physics 
 Political Science 
 Zoology

Academics 
The college offers five postgraduate programmes and ten undergraduate programmes. The Department of Economics functions as a research centre approved by Mahatma Gandhi University. All programmes follow the Choice Based Credit and Semester System (CBCSS). Admission to programmes is through the Centralised Allotment Process (CAP) of Mahatma Gandhi University. Working days are from Monday through Friday and class hours are from 10:00 am to 4:00 pm.

Academic programmes

Postgraduate programmes 
 Master of Arts in economics
 Master of Arts in political Science
 Master of Commerce
 Master of Science in geology
 Master of Science in physics
 Master of Science in industrial chemistry

Undergraduate programmes 
 Bachelor of Arts in economics
 Bachelor of Arts in English
 Bachelor of Arts in political science
 Bachelor of Commerce
 Bachelor of Science in botany
 Bachelor of Science in chemistry (Model II)
 Bachelor of Science in geology
 Bachelor of Science in mathematics
 Bachelor of Science in physics
 Bachelor of Science in zoology (Model II)

Notable alumni
 Manoj K. Jayan, Actor

See also
 Government Degree Colleges in India

References

External links
 http://gckottayam.ac.in
 http://www.collegiateedu.kerala.gov.in/
 http://www.kottayamgeology.com/

List of colleges affiliated with Mahatma Gandhi University, Kerala#Art and Sciences

Arts and Science colleges in Kerala
Universities and colleges in Kottayam
Colleges affiliated to Mahatma Gandhi University, Kerala
Educational institutions established in 1972
1972 establishments in Kerala